This article lists the winners and nominees for the NAACP Image Award for Outstanding Actress in a Comedy Series. It was known as the Outstanding Lead Actress in a Comedy Series until 2000. Currently, Tracee Ellis Ross holds the record for most wins in this category, having won nine times.

Winners and nominees
Winners are listed first and highlighted in bold.

1980s

1990s

2000s

2010s

2020s

Multiple wins and nominations

Wins

 9 wins
 Tracee Ellis Ross

 4 wins
 Mo'Nique
 Jasmine Guy

 3 wins
 Phylicia Rashad

 2 wins
 Cassi Davis
 Tamera Mowry
 Tia Mowry
 Issa Rae

Nominations

 17 nominations
 Tracee Ellis Ross

 7 nominations
 Wendy Raquel Robinson

 6 nominations
 Tisha Campbell-Martin
 Jasmine Guy

 5 nominations
 Tichina Arnold 
 Mo'Nique
 Tia Mowry
 Issa Rae
 Phylicia Rashad
 Holly Robinson Peete

 4 nominations
 Brandy
 Cassi Davis
 America Ferrera
 Niecy Nash
 Kellita Smith

 3 nominations
 Uzo Aduba
 Erika Alexander
 Tatyana Ali
 Kim Coles
 Loretta Devine
 Queen Latifah
 Yara Shahidi

 2 nominations
 Golden Brooks
 Logan Browning
 Pam Grier
 Regina Hall
 Mindy Kaling
 Tamera Mowry
 Elise Neal
 Raven-Symoné
 Vanessa Williams

References

NAACP Image Awards
Awards for actresses